General Om Prakash Malhotra,  (6 August 1922 – 29 December 2015), best known as OP Malhotra,  was a senior army officer in the Indian Army who served as the 10th Chief of Army Staff of the Indian Army from 19781981. Upon retiring from his military service in India, he served in the Indian Foreign Service when he tenured as the Indian Ambassador to Indonesia 1981-1984, and later served as a political administrator in India as the Governor of Punjab and Administrator of Chandigarh 1990-1991.

Early life
Om Prakash Malhotra was born on 6 August 1922 in Srinagar, Jammu and Kashmir, British India, into a Punjabi Hindu Khatri family of the Malhotra clan, within the Dhai Ghar family-group. Malhotra received his schooling first at Model High School, Srinagar, and then at Sri Pratap College, Srinagar. He then attended Government College University, Lahore, before being selected to join the Indian Military Academy (IMA), Dera Doon.

Military career
He was commissioned into the Regiment of Artillery as a Second Lieutenant in November 1941. His first assignment was with 26 (Jacobs) Mountain Battery in Razmak, North West Frontier Province. He was later assigned to 15 (Jhelum) Mountain Battery which, as part of the 50th Parachute Brigade, fought against the Japanese during the Second World War on the Burmese front. He distinguished himself as a young officer in the Battle of Sangshak where he was wounded in action. He later became Second-in-Command of 13 (Dardoni) Mountain Battery.

Malhotra became an instructor at the School of Artillery in Deolali, and in 1946 attended the Long Gunnery Staff Course at the Royal School of Artillery in Larkhill, United Kingdom. He commanded artillery regiments across India between November 1950 and July 1961 including 37 Coorg Anti Tank Regiment, 20 Locating Regiment and 42 Field Regiment. In between he served at Army HQ, New Delhi, did the Defense Services Staff College course at Wellington and was later an instructor at the Defense Services Staff College, Wellington. He was then posted from 1962 to 1965 as the Military and Naval Attaché of India to the USSR, concurrently accredited to Poland and Hungary, holding the local rank of brigadier in the role.

Upon return from Moscow in August 1965, Malhotra commanded 1 Artillery Brigade, part of 1 Armoured Division and fought in Sialkot Sector during the Indo-Pakistani War of 1965. After the ceasefire with Pakistan he commanded 167 Mountain Brigade at Sela Pass, Tawang District, North-East Frontier Agency. He was promoted to acting Major General in September 1967 and commanded 36 Infantry Division in Saugor for two years, with a promotion to substantive major-general on 28 February 1968. From 29 September 1969 till May 1972 he was Chief of Staff, IV Corps, in Tezpur during the Bangladesh Liberation War. He played a crucial role during the Battle of Sialkot during the Bangladesh Liberation War where, "the thrust by the 1 Artillery Brigade under his command forced Pakistan to thin forces from its main attack column that had overrun Khemkaran and was making a bid to drive a wedge through the heart of Punjab." Subsequently, he was promoted to acting lieutenant-general on 29 May 1972 (substantive from 15 October) and given command of XI Corps in Jalandhar, which he commanded for two years. He was later the GOC-in-C Southern Command located at malappuram.

In 1976, Malhotra was awarded the Param Vishist Seva Medal for "service of the most exceptional order". He was Vice Chief of Army Staff before taking over as Chief of Army Staff of the Indian Army on 31 May 1978 and serving in that post for three years. He was an Honorary Senior Colonel Commandant of the Regiment of Artillery of the Indian Army and also an Honorary General of the Nepalese Army.

Ambassador to Indonesia and Governor of Punjab
After retiring from the Indian Army on 31 May 1981, Malhotra served as the Ambassador of India to Indonesia from 1981 to 1984. During 1990-1991, he was the Governor of the Indian State of Punjab and Administrator of Chandigarh when militancy in that state was at its height. Malhotra resigned from his post in protest when planned elections in the state were deferred by the National Election Commission without notice. Upon the postponement of the elections he said that "I have been through three Wars, I have been a General in the Wars, but I have never felt as defeated as I feel today after this announcement by the Election Commission that the Elections have been postponed."

Post-retirement
A keen sportsman, Malhotra was the Founder President of the Asian Equestrian Federation in 1978. He was also the President of the Delhi Golf Club, New Delhi from 1979 - 1980.

He served for nine years as the President of the Equestrian Federation of India a post which he took on while serving as Chief of Army Staff and continued in post-retirement. He was responsible for the revival of the cavalry sport of Tent Pegging in India and across Asia, as an equestrian sport. After a demonstration of the sport in New Delhi to HRH Prince Philip, Duke of Edinburgh, the serving President of International Federation for Equestrian Sports, approval was granted for its inclusion as an equestrian sport under regional governance which led to its inclusion in the Asian Games from 1981 onwards.
 
Malhotra was a Founder Trustee of the Nehru Trust for the Indian Collections at the Victoria & Albert Museum, and served as the President of India's largest NGO, the "National Association for the Blind" in New Delhi. He was the Chairperson of the National Association for the Blind Centre For Blind Women & Disability Studies. He was an active member of Kiwanis Club of New Delhi, patron of the All India Federation of The Deaf, and a Trustee of the Delhi Cheshire Homes.

In addition, Malhotra was also the Founder and Chairman Emeritus of two charitable organisations Shiksha and Chikitsa.<ref></rg/trusteesef></ref>

Personal life
Malhotra was married to Saroj, with whom he had two children. His son, Ajai Malhotra, was Ambassador of India to the Russian Federation from 2011 - 2013.

Death
Malhotra died at his home in Gurugram due to complications of old age on 29 December 2015. On 31 December 2015 his funeral was held with full military honours at Brar Square. As former Chief of Army Staff from the Regiment of Artillery his body was carried to the funeral on an artillery gun carriage.

Honours and awards
 1976: Param Vishist Seva Medal for "service of the most exceptional order".
 1977: Honorary Senior Colonel Commandant of the Regiment of Artillery.
 1980: Honorary General of the Nepalese Army.
 1994: conferred the Degree of Doctor of Letters Honoris Causa by University of Jammu

Dates of rank

Notes

References

External links
 The Official Website of the Indian Army
 A List of All Former Chiefs of the Indian Army

1922 births
2015 deaths
Punjabi people
Indian Hindus
Punjabi Hindus
Chiefs of Army Staff (India)
Vice Chiefs of Army Staff (India)
Governors of Punjab, India
Recipients of the Param Vishisht Seva Medal
Indian generals
Ambassadors of India to Indonesia
Indian military attachés
Defence Services Staff College alumni